Lucius Vipstanus Messalla was a Roman Senator.

Life
He was consul ordinarius in 115 with Marcus Pedo Vergilianus as his colleague. Vergilianus was killed in an earthquake at the end of January and was replaced by Titus Statilius Maximus Severus Hadrianus, who completed the nundinium with Messalla as consul suffectus.

Ronald Syme states that Vipstanus Messalla was the son of Lucius Vipstanus Messalla. The younger Messalla had a son named Lucius Vipstanus Poplicola Messalla.

References

2nd-century Romans
Imperial Roman consuls
Messalla, Lucius
Year of birth unknown
Year of death unknown